The Indian Tea Association is a trade association of Indian tea producers. The head office is in Kolkata (Calcutta).

History 

The Association was founded in 1881 to protect the interests of tea planters in British India and to promote the consumption of Indian tea. It had offices in London and in India. It also laid down rules for the recruitment of labour for the plantations and in the early twentieth century attempted to raise the standards of treatment of labourers.

References

Further reading 

 Social perspective of labour legislation in India 1859–1932: As applied to tea plantations (1987) by Ramkrishna Chattopadhyay
 The early history of the Tea industry in North-East India (1918) by Harold Mann
 The Tea industry in India :A Review of Finance and Labour, and a guide for Capitalists and Assistants (1882) by Samuel Baildon
 Tea Planter's Life in Assam (1884) by George Barker
 The Recollections of a Tea Planter (1937) by W M Fraser
  Indian Tea Association
  ITA to promote Tea
 ABITA implements Social Welfare schemes in Assam with UNICEF

Tea industry in India
Organisations based in Kolkata
Organisations based in Assam
Trade associations based in India
1881 establishments in India
Organizations established in 1881